The 2005–06 Druga HNL (also known as 2. HNL) season was the 15th season of Croatia's second level football since its establishment in 1992. The league was contested in two regional groups (North Division and South Division), with 12 clubs each. This was the last season under that format as the following season featured united Druga HNL with 16 teams. Mosor were originally relegated but were reprieved so that the following season has 16 clubs.

North Division

Clubs

First stage

Play-off Group

Play-out Group

South Division

Clubs

First stage

Play-off Group

Play-out Group

Promotion play-off

Belišće did not get a first level license so the promotion playoff against Šibenik was cancelled and Šibenik was automatically promoted.

See also
2005–06 Prva HNL
2005–06 Croatian Cup

References

External links
2005–06 in Croatian Football at Rec.Sport.Soccer Statistics Foundation
Official website  

First Football League (Croatia) seasons
Cro
Drug